Roberto Giacomi (born August 1, 1986) is a Canadian former professional soccer player who played as a goalkeeper.

Career
While with Markham Lightning he went on to win numerous tournaments and maintain the best goals against average in the league each year at the club. At this time Giacomi also established himself as the number one goalkeeper for the Ontario Soccer Association and the Canadian Soccer Association

In November 2006 Giacomi left Rangers and joined KSK Beveren in the Jupiler League in Belgium. Giacomi immediately impressed at the club becoming a fan favorite and battled for the number one position with 1st choice goalkeeper Boubacar Barry. Giacomi played 4 matches against the likes of R.S.C. Anderlecht for the club.

International career
Giacomi represented Canada at the FIFA U-20 World Cup in the Netherlands in 2005 in a group with Syria, Colombia and Italy. Giacomi was called up to the 2007 CONCACAF Gold Cup where the Canadian Men's Team made it to the semi-final round against USA.

References

External links
 

1986 births
Living people
2007 CONCACAF Gold Cup players
Canadian expatriate soccer players
Canadian expatriate sportspeople in Belgium
Canadian expatriate sportspeople in Norway
Canadian soccer players
Belgian Pro League players
Expatriate footballers in Belgium
Expatriate footballers in Norway
Expatriate footballers in Scotland
Association football goalkeepers
Canadian people of Italian descent
K.S.K. Beveren players
Kristiansund BK players
Soccer players from Toronto
Rangers F.C. players
Scottish Football League players
Stirling Albion F.C. players
Canada men's youth international soccer players
Canadian expatriate sportspeople in Scotland